Deengarh is a village under Sangaria Tahsil in Hanumangarh District, Rajasthan, India. It belongs to Bikaner Division. It is 416 km from the state capital at Jaipur, 39 km north of the District headquarters at Hanumangarh and 11 km from Sangaria. Its Pin code is 335063 and postal head office is Sangaria, Hanumangarh. By Rail Dhaban Railway Station is the major nearby railway station, 66km to Deengarh. Surjaram Jakhar founded the village. But this claim in doubtful. Many people from the village claims that its name came from Dina named Muslim lady. Had Surjaram Jakhar founded this village he would have some logic behind it to name it Deengarh. Also it is unknown when Sitaram or Dina founded this village.

The village is a place of pilgrimage and is known for Bajarang Bali temple. On every full moon night glory of temple is at its best and a massive festival is organised.

Nearby places
 Haripura- 6 km
 Bolanwali- 7 km
 Sangaria- 10 km
 Malarampura- 11 km 
 Nathwana- 12 km
 punjab-  8 km
 haryana- 10 km

Education
Colleges near to Deengarh-
 Gramotthan Vidyapeeth T. T. College
 Sangaria- Manavmangal College Of Education
 Sangaria- Meera Kanya P.g. Mahavidyalaya
 Sangaria- D.r. Mahila T.t. College
 Sangaria- G.v. Home Science College
 Sangaria 
Schools near Deengarh 
 Tagor Public Secondary School- NEAR KISHANPURA LAKE VPO-KISHANPURA UTTRADA
 Khalsa Public Sen. Sec. school, morjand Sikhan- ward no.-3, dandiwal mohalla 
 Sarswati Vidhya Niketan Public Secondary School- Ward No.5
 S.b.m. Sn.sec.school Haripura- WARD No.06 JAKHAR GAWAAD

References

Villages in Hanumangarh district